La môme vert-de-gris (French for "The Greyish-Green Dame"), released in the USA as Poison Ivy, is a 1953 French crime film.

It was French director Bernard Borderie's first film, as well as American-born French actor Eddie Constantine's. The screenplay is based on the 1937 Lemmy Caution thriller Poison Ivy by Peter Cheyney, which had been in 1945 the first title published in Marcel Duhamel's Série noire. The story involves FBI agent Caution investigating gold smuggling activity in Casablanca.

Crew
 Director: Bernard Borderie
 Screenplay: Bernard Borderie and Jacques Berland
 Assistant director: André Smagghe
 Cinematography: Jacques Lemare
 Music: Guy Lafarge

Cast
 Eddie Constantine - Lemmy Caution
 Dominique Wilms - Carlotta de la Rue
 Howard Vernon - Rudy Saltierra
 Darío Moreno - Joe Madrigal
 Maurice Ronet - Mickey
 Nicolas Vogel - Kerts 
 Philippe Hersent - Le commissaire
 Jess Hahn - Le marin-geolier 
 Gaston Modot - L'inspecteur #1
 Paul Azaïs - Le patron du bistrot

Synopsis
Set in Casablanca, it recycles aspects of the atmospheric noirish French films of the 1930s together with pulp-fiction American detective films of the post-war period. Considered either "tongue-in-cheek" or "doddery", the film "utilizes all the rules of the genre, albeit without convictions: chases, fistfights, nightclubs, unusual settings, knowing winks at the public".

It was a commercial success in France (3,846,158 French entries in 1953) and was followed by 7 other Lemmy Caution films until 1967, not counting Jean-Luc Godard's "incomprehensible" Alphaville, a strange adventure of Lemmy Caution, casting Constantine and Vernon. Constantine's enduring success started with this. This film was considered "emblematic of French postwar attitudes towards the United States: a fascination for U.S. culture tempered by fear of U.S. dominance".

References

External links
 La môme vert-de-gris unifrance.org 
 

1953 films
Films directed by Bernard Borderie
Films set in Morocco
Films based on British novels
French crime films
1953 crime films
French black-and-white films
1950s French-language films
1950s French films